The collared palm thrush (Cichladusa arquata) is a species of bird in the family Muscicapidae.
It is found in Botswana, Burundi, Democratic Republic of the Congo, Kenya, Malawi, Mozambique, Rwanda, Tanzania, Uganda, Zambia, and Zimbabwe.
Its natural habitats are dry savannah and subtropical or tropical moist shrubland.

References

External links
Image at ADW

External links
 Collared palm thrush - Species text in The Atlas of Southern African Birds.

collared palm thrush
Birds of Sub-Saharan Africa
collared palm thrush
collared palm thrush
Taxonomy articles created by Polbot